Korea Today, first published as New Korea, is a North Korean propaganda magazine published monthly by the Foreign Languages Publishing House in Pyongyang.

The magazine focuses on cultural and industrial progress made in the country. It also publishes North Korea short stories. Copies of the magazine are handed out to tourists on flights into the country.

The magazine was initially published in Russian only. Today, it is published in English, Arabic, Chinese, French, Russian, and Spanish.

History
The magazine was first published as New Korea in January 1950 by the New Korea Publishing House, the predecessor of the Foreign Languages Publishing House. Since 1959, it has been published as Korea Today.

In December 1955, Son Din-fa, the chief editor of New Korea, was dismissed from his post and convicted to manual labor after drawing influences of de-Stalinization from the Soviet Union and criticizing the personality cult of Kim Il-sung.

See also

 Foreign Trade of the DPRK
 Media of North Korea

References

External links
  at Publications of the DPRK

Communist magazines
Local interest magazines
Magazines established in 1950
Mass media in Pyongyang
Monthly magazines
Multilingual magazines
Magazines published in North Korea
Propaganda newspapers and magazines
1950 establishments in North Korea